The Museum of the Earth in Warsaw (pol. Muzeum Ziemi PAN w Warszawie), established in 1948 and continuing a tradition initiated by Earth Museum Society back in 1932, has been operating within the structure of the Polish Academy of Sciences since 1959.

The Museum of the Earth is located in two historical buildings at Na Skarpie Avenue in the center of Warsaw, perched on high Vistula escarpment.

Collection 
The museum's collection comprises over 170,000 specimens and objects covering all geological sciences, with special regard to Polish minerals, precious stones, meteorites and rocks, Baltic amber, fossil flora and fauna and archival documents on the history of the Earth sciences. Particular noteworthy is its extensive collection of amber and other fossil resins, ranking among the largest natural-science collections of its type worldwide.

Permanent exhibitions and Exhibit stands 

 Planet Earth
 Processes Shaping The Earth
 From The Earth's Geological Past
 Amber - From Liquid Resin To Ornamental Art
 Meteorites - Stones From The Sky
 Mineralogical Alphabet
 Large Mammals Of The Ice Age
 Granites
 Before Coal Was Formed
 Armored Lords of the Early Seas
 From the Archives Treasures of the Museum of the Earth
 Beginnings of Geology in Poland
 Earth Science Scholars on Postage Stamps

Temporary exhibitions 

 Especially expositions from series: Nature And Art

Open-air exhibitions 
 Monument Erratic Boulders
 Lapidarium - Building Stones In Poland

Historical - exhibit point 
 The Lasting Blood Of Warsaw's Insurgents - the traces of blood that are preserved on the marble steps of the stairs at the Pniewski villa at 27 Na Skarpie Av., where today Museum of the Earth has exhibit rooms, are an extraordinary and one of a kind venue for the remembrance of the Warsaw Uprising of 1944.

Earth 
Natural history museums in Poland
Polish Academy of Sciences
Museums established in 1948
Geology museums in Poland